For the bones of a fish see fish bone

Fishbone may also refer to:
 Fishbone, U.S. alternative rock band formed in 1979 in Los Angeles, California
 Fishbone diagram, aka Ishikawa diagram, used to identify potential factors causing an overall effect
 Fishbone (EP), recording debut of alternative group Fishbone

People with the surname